Marin Čilić was the defending champion, but withdrew due to injury.

Ivo Karlović won the title, defeating Donald Young in the final, 6–3, 6–3.

Seeds

 Kevin Anderson (second round)
 John Isner (first round)
 Alexandr Dolgopolov (quarterfinals)
 Ivo Karlović (champion)
 Adrian Mannarino (semifinals)
 Sam Querrey (first round, retired)
 Steve Johnson (quarterfinals)
 Viktor Troicki (second round)

Draw

Finals

Top half

Bottom half

Qualifying

Seeds

 Aljaž Bedene (second round)
 Victor Hănescu (qualifying competition)
 Thanasi Kokkinakis (qualified)
 Yoshihito Nishioka (qualified)
 Ryan Harrison (withdrew)
 Chase Buchanan (second round)
 Alex Kuznetsov (qualifying competition)
 Jared Donaldson (first round)

Qualifiers

Qualifying draw

First qualifier

Second qualifier

Third qualifier

Fourth qualifier

References
 Main Draw
 Qualifying Draw

Delray Beach International Tennis Championships - Singles
2015 Singles
2015 Delray Beach International Tennis Championships